Tajuan Marquis Porter (born March 9, 1988) is an American professional basketball player who last played for Lille Métropole of the LNB Pro B. He played college basketball for Oregon.

High school career
Porter attended Renaissance High School in Michigan (Porter's former Oregon teammate, Malik Hairston, also attended Renaissance High School). He led Renaissance to two state championships (2004, 2006) and a four-year record of 93–10. As a junior, he averaged 19.6 points, 5.0 rebounds and 5.0 assists per game while garnering first team all-state, all-league and all-city honors.  In a 67–50 win against Rogers, he recorded a quadruple-double with 16 points, 10 rebounds, 10 assists and 10 steals. As a senior, he averaged 26.3 points, 6.0 rebounds, 5.0 assists and 5.0 steals per game. He was named first team all-state at the end of both his junior and senior campaigns.

College career
A 5'7" (1.70 m) point guard, Porter was one of the shortest NCAA Division I college basketball players. He was considered one of the top freshmen in the country during the 2006–07 season. He had his best career game against Portland State. Against the Vikings, he scored 38 points, including 10–12 from three-point field goal range. The 10 three-point field goals shattered the single game Oregon record. His 110 made three-point field goals is an Oregon single-season record, and is good enough for the all-time Pac-10 freshman record. After the Ducks won the 2007 Pac-10 tournament against the University of Southern California, he was named the tournament's MVP.

Porter holds the school and Pac-10 Conference record for most career 3-pointers made with 345. He also ranks eighth in school history for career field goals made (584) and ninth in career steals (103).

Professional career
Porter went undrafted in the 2010 NBA draft. On November 1, 2010, he was selected by the Maine Red Claws in the 4th round of the 2010 NBA D-League draft. On November 15, 2010, he was waived by the Red Claws. Later that month, he signed with the Halifax Rainmen for the 2011 PBL season. In February 2011, he moved to Entente Orléanaise of France.

In March 2012, he signed with Union Neuchatel Basket of Switzerland but left before playing in a game for them.

On November 2, 2012, he was selected by the Rio Grande Valley Vipers in the 6th round of the 2012 NBA D-League draft. On November 21, 2012, he was waived by the Vipers. On December 14, 2012, he was re-acquired by the Vipers, but again waived on January 29, 2013. On February 6, 2013, he was acquired by the Reno Bighorns.

In November 2013, he was reacquired by the Reno Bighorns. On February 4, 2014, he was waived by the Bighorns. On February 7, 2014, he was acquired by the Sioux Falls Skyforce. On March 18, 2014, he was waived by the Skyforce. On April 4, 2014, he was reacquired by the Bighorns.

On November 2, 2014, he was again reacquired by the Reno Bighorns. On February 19, 2015, he recorded a career-high 41 points and 13 assists in a 142–147 loss to the Austin Spurs.

References

External links

NBA D-League Profile
Oregon bio

1988 births
Living people
American expatriate basketball people in Canada
American expatriate basketball people in France
American men's basketball players
Basketball players from Detroit
Halifax Rainmen players
Lille Métropole BC players
Orléans Loiret Basket players
Oregon Ducks men's basketball players
Point guards
Reno Bighorns players
Rio Grande Valley Vipers players
Sioux Falls Skyforce players
Renaissance High School alumni